is an adventure video game with role-playing video game elements published by Atlus in 1991. This game stars a cast of mostly vegetables; Spud, a cap-wearing potato, is the hero and must save Princess Mato from the evil clutches of Devi.

Gameplay
Controlling Spud, the player must ascend Far Tower. As Spud fights enemies with his projectile weapon, he gains experience points, and for every 100 points, he gains a level and additional health. Each floor of the tower houses either a maze-like area, enemies, puzzles, cinema scenes, characters with useful tips, or a combination. Keys can be found to open doors and stairs let Spud get to the next floor.

Story

In the Vegetable Kingdom, The King (a tomato) decides it is time to find his daughter Princess Mato a husband. She feels embarrassed by this. This is when the castle is stormed by Devi, a demonic beetle that represents the Devil.

Princess Mato is kidnapped and taken to Devi's castle where he holds her prisoner. The King is terrified for his daughter's life and orders two knights, Arnie Eggplant and Gerrit Carrot to go rescue her. Both head off on their journey but they never return. This is when Spud, a lonely wanderer offers to go to Devi's castle and attempt to find The King's daughter. The King is grateful for his help, and gives Spud his blessing.

During the adventure, Spud rescues both Arnie and Gerrit, who decide to help Spud by finishing the job they started. Spud even meets one of Arnie's friends on the first floor of the castle, Terry Turnip, who replaces Arnie in helping Spud find the Princess later on throughout the game.  In the end, Devi and Spud face off alone and Spud is victorious. Devi defeated, Spud rescues the Princess and returns her to The King. Spud then says it is time for him to go, and he leaves to continue wandering the world.

Princess Mato calls after him, and decides she wants to go with him, and with this, the game is over.

References

External links

Spud's Adventure at MobyGames
JPgbx

1991 video games
Atlus games
Fictional tubers
Fruit and vegetable characters
Game Boy games
Game Boy-only games
Multiplayer and single-player video games
Puzzle video games
Top-down video games
Video games about food and drink
Video games developed in Japan
Video games scored by Hirotoshi Suzuki